Derrick Daniel Dillon (born 8 June 1960) is a Scottish writer. He was Writer-in-Residence at Castlemilk from 1998-2000. He is a poet, short story writer, novelist, dramatist, broadcaster, screenwriter, and scriptwriter for TV, stage and radio. His books have been published in the US, India, Russia, Sweden, in Catalan, French and Spanish. His poetry has been anthologised internationally.

Early years
He was born in Coatbridge and studied English literature at Strathclyde University before becoming a teacher.

Career
His novel Me and Ma Gal (1995), chronicles a day in the lives of two best friends, Derek and Gal, set against the Coatbridge landscape of slagpits and steelworks, and was shortlisted for the Saltire Society Scottish First Book of the Year Award, was included in The 100 Greatest Ever Scottish Books and won the World Book Day ‘We Are What We Read’ poll for the novel that best describes Scotland today.

In Six Black Candles (2002) (a novel originally written as a play for Birds of Paradise Theatre Company in 1999) the heroine Caroline, who has been deserted by her wayward husband Bobby, finds her sisters embarking on a ritualistic revenge, centered on the six black candles of the title.

Des Dillon's play, Singin I'm No a Billy He's a Tim gained critical acclaim at the Edinburgh Fringe Festival in 2005 and toured Scotland and Ireland in 2007. Monks (2006) was originally published as The Big Q (2001) and was adapted into play which enjoyed its world premiere in the Royal Lyceum, Edinburgh in 2007.

My Epileptic Lurcher (2008) is the story of Manny Riley, a recovering alcoholic and struggling scriptwriter with a serious anger management problem, and his newly adopted lurcher, Bailey, who has epilepsy. The book is loosely based on Des Dillon's own life, and his lurcher (also called Bailey) who has epilepsy.

Awards and honors
His latest award was The Lion and Unicorn prize for the best of Irish and British literature in the Russian Language (2007).

Personal life
Des lives in Galloway with his wife and dogs.

Published work
Sniz   Bloody Write, 1994
Me and Ma Gal   Argyll Publishing, 1995
The Big Empty: A Collection of Short Stories, Argyll Publishing, 1997
Duck   Argyll Publishing, 1998
Itchycooblue   Headline Review, 1999
Return of the Busby Babes   Headline Review, 2000
New Writing 10   (contributor)   Picador in Association with the British Council, 2001
The Big Q   Headline Review, 2001
Six Black Candles   Headline, 2002
Picking Brambles   Luath Press, 2003
The Glasgow Dragon   Luath Press, 2004
The Blue Hen Novella   Sandstone Press, 2004
Singin I'm No a Billy He's a Tim   Luath Press, 2005
They Scream When You Kill Them   Luath Press, 2006
Monks,  Luath Press, 2007
My Epileptic Lurcher,  Luath Press, 2008
An Experiment in Compassion, Luath Press, 2011
Yalena;s Leningrad, Kindle, 2013

References

External links
http://www.booksfromscotland.com/Authors/Des-Dillon
http://www.list.co.uk/article/2787-me-and-ma-gal-des-dillon-1995/
Des Dillon official author website

Living people
People from Coatbridge
1960 births
Scottish dramatists and playwrights
20th-century Scottish dramatists and playwrights
21st-century Scottish dramatists and playwrights
21st-century Scottish writers
People from Dumfries and Galloway